Kalamandalam Ramankutty Nair (25 May 1925 – 11 March 2013) was a performer of Kathakali, who practiced the Kerala art form for more than seven decades.

Biography
His guru was Pattikkamthodi Ravunni Menon, his only teacher in his entire career. Both hail from Vellinezhi, which is still known for producing many Kathakali artistes, in Palakkad district. Ramankutty Nair had served in his alma mater, Kerala Kalamandalam, and went on to become its principal.

Born in 1925, Ramankutty Nair hailed from a family with no Kathakali pedigree. But Ravunni Menon, a resident tutor at the renowned Olappamanna Mana (a mansion of the upper-caste Nambudiris) was an overarching presence in the cultural scene of the village, and soon little Ramankutty too fell under his spell. At Kerala Kalamandalam, where he subsequently mastered the art, Ramankutty Nair later sculpted out several disciples, the most prominent among them being Kalamandalam Gopi besides Kalamandalam Vasu Pisharody, M.P.S. Namboodiri, Balasubramanian and the late K. Gopalakrishnan.

Many of the younger generation Kathakali artistes from Kalamandalam, like Soman and Shanmughan, too have had Ramankutty Nair as their guru for advanced training. (He retired as principal of Kalamandalam in 1985). In his later years, Ramankutty Nair was the chairman of Gandhi Seva Sadan, or Sadanam Kathakali Akademi as it is better known.

Active as an artiste till the age of 85, he performed across Kerala, and graced stages in the rest of India and several countries of the world. He was well known for his roles of Ravana in plays such as 'Thoranayudham' and 'Ravanolbhavam', Narakasura in 'Narakasuravadham', Duryodhana in 'Uttaraswayamvaram', Sisupala in 'Rajasooyam', Hanuman in 'Kalyanasaugandhikam', 'Thoranayudham' and 'Lavanasuravadham', Keechaka in 'Keechakavadham', Dharmaputra in 'Kirmeeravadham' and Arjuna in 'Kalakeyavadham'. Another famous role is that of Parasurama in 'Seethaswayamvaram', the costume of which was of his own design.

The generally reticent Ramankutty Nair, who has penned an autobiography named Thiranottam, was a winner of the coveted Padma Bhushan award of the Government of India. Renowned filmmaker Adoor Gopalakrishnan has made an eponymous documentary on Kalamandalam Ramankutty Nair. of Kathakali, and is a film by the same name on him by Adoor Gopalakrishnan.

Personal life

The master lived in his native Vellinezhi with his wife Saraswati. On 15 May 2009, he celebrated his 'satabhishekam' (84th birthday) amid fanfare in the nearest town of Cherpulassery.

Ramankutty Nair died on 11 March 2013 at age 87.

Awards

 1974 – Sangeet Natak Akademi Award
 1985 – Kerala Sangeetha Nataka Akademi Award
 2004 – Sangeet Natak Akademi Fellowship
 2007 – Padma Bhushan
 2010 – Honorary doctorate by Cochin University of Science and Technology

Sources

External links

1925 births
2013 deaths
Male actors from Kerala
Recipients of the Padma Bhushan in arts
People from Palakkad district
Malayali people
Kathakali exponents
Recipients of the Sangeet Natak Akademi Award
Dancers from Kerala
Indian male dancers
Recipients of the Sangeet Natak Akademi Fellowship
Recipients of the Kerala Sangeetha Nataka Akademi Award